Nanjil K. Manoharan (February 1929 – 1 August 2000) was an Indian politician and former Member of the Legislative Assembly of Tamil Nadu. He was Tamil Nadu's minister of Finance during 1977–1980 and minister of Revenue during 1996–2000.

Personal life 
Manoharan was born in the Kottar area of Nagercoil town in February 1929. He died of cardiac arrest at the age of 71 on 1 August 2000 in Chennai. He was survived by his wife, two sons and two daughters.

Political career 
 He was elected to the Tamil Nadu legislative assembly four times, in 1977, 1984, 1989 and 1996.
 He was elected to the Indian Parliament three times (in 1962, 67 and 71).
 He was a member of the Dravida Munnetra Kazhagam (DMK) till 1974
 Then he joined the Anna Dravida Munnetra Kazhagam (ADMK). He served as Finance minister in the M. G. Ramachandran (MGR) cabinet during 1977–80.
 He returned to the DMK in 1980 and became its Deputy General Secretary. He was a good speaker and poetry writer. He was the Revenue minister in the M. Karunanidhi cabinet during 1989–1991 and 1996–2000.

Electoral history

References 

People from Kanyakumari district
Tamil Nadu MLAs 1996–2001
Dravida Munnetra Kazhagam politicians
State cabinet ministers of Tamil Nadu
2000 deaths
1929 births
India MPs 1962–1967
India MPs 1967–1970
India MPs 1971–1977
Tamil Nadu MLAs 1985–1989
Lok Sabha members from Tamil Nadu
All India Anna Dravida Munnetra Kazhagam politicians
Politicians from Chennai